Savanna Dry is a South African cider introduced by the Distell Group Limited in May 1996. Savanna Dry is sold in over 40 countries, and it is South Africa’s leading cider export and the third-largest cider brand in the world. Savanna Dry is produced from crushed apples grown in the Elgin Valley of the fertile Western Cape, and it is described as a clear, refreshing and dry tasting cider. The production of the cider takes place in the apple cider plant in Paarl. The overall production process is typically two weeks in length and during this period; the product is run through a micro-filtration process where it is triple filtered and double chilled. Savanna is available in four variations: Savanna Dry, Savanna Light and the recently added Savanna Blackbeard and Savanna Loco. Savanna Loco has  a tequila flavour. Savanna Dry is the first cider produced by Savanna and contains an alcohol level of 6% ABV. Savanna Light was launched in May 2000 and contains an alcohol level of 3% ABV.

References

External links

 https://savannacider.com/

Products introduced in 1996
Brands of cider
South African alcoholic drinks
South African brands